Area codes 937 and 326 are telephone area codes in the North American Numbering Plan (NANP) assigned to a numbering plan area (NPA) that encompasses much of the southwestern part of the U.S. state of Ohio, including Dayton and Springfield. Area code 937 was established in September 1996, after a split of area code 513. Area code 326 was added to area code 937 in an overlay plan in March 2020.

History
Area code 937 was created in a split of Ohio's original NPA for the southwestern part of the state (area code 513) on September 28, 1996. At the time, literature promoting the new area code took advantage of the fact that the digits of 937 spell out "YES" on a standard telephone keypad.

As of April 2018, projections by the North American Numbering Plan Administrator expected that telephone exchanges ("central office codes") would be exhausted for area code 937 by the third quarter of 2020, so on July 3, 2018, area code 326 (which spells out "DAO" as in "DAyton, Ohio") was planned to overlay the 937 area. Beginning August 10, 2019, subscribers were encouraged to dial ten digits for local calls within the area code. On February 8, 2020, traditional seven-digit dialing ended. Customers attempting such calls receive an intercept message. On March 8, 2020, area code 326 was activated.

Communities
Area codes 937 and 326 serve Dayton, its metropolitan area, Springfield, public (non-Defense Switched Network) communications at Wright-Patterson Air Force Base, a few outer eastern suburbs of Cincinnati, and most of southwest Ohio north and east of the Cincinnati metropolitan area.

Communities served with a 2019 population greater than 10,000, and those that are county seats, include Beavercreek, Bellefontaine, Centerville, Clayton, Dayton, Eaton, Englewood, Fairborn, Franklin, Georgetown, Greenville, Hillsboro, Huber Heights, Kettering, Marysville, Miamisburg, Piqua, Riverside, Sidney, Springboro, Springfield, Tipp City, Trotwood, Troy, Urbana, Vandalia, West Carrollton, West Union, Wilmington and Xenia.

Counties covered include all or parts of Adams, Brown, Champaign, Clark, Clermont, Clinton, Darke, Greene, Hardin, Highland, Logan, Madison, Miami, Montgomery, Preble, Ross, Scioto, Shelby, Union and Warren.

See also
List of area code overlays
List of North American Numbering Plan area codes
List of Ohio area codes

References

External links

 List of exchanges from localcallingguide.com, 937 Area Code
 List of exchanges from localcallingguide.com, 326 Area Code
 List of exchanges from AreaCodeDownload.com, 937 Area Code

937
937
Telecommunications-related introductions in 1996
Telecommunications-related introductions in 2020